Abdullah bin Thunayan Al Saud (عبد الله بن ثنيان بن إبراهيم آل سعود; died July 1843) was Emir of Nejd from 1841 to May 1843. He is the sole member of the Al Thunayan branch of the Al Saud who became emir.

Early years
Abdullah bin Thunayan was a great-grandson of Thunayan bin Saud, who was the brother of Muhammad bin Saud, founder of the Emirate of Diriyah. Therefore, he was a great-great-grandson of the founder of the Al Saud dynasty, Saud bin Muhammad.

Until 1841 Abdullah was in southern Iraq under the protection of the Muntafiq tribe. He first came Hejaz and made several unsuccessful attempts to capture the Emirate of Nejd.

Reign
Abdullah's third-cousin Khalid bin Saud, the Emir of Nejd, had been backed by the Egyptians and lost power when they had to leave Nejd in 1840. Finally Abdullah ousted Khalid bin Saud in December 1841. Abdullah's major supporter was the ruler of Al Hariq, Turki Al Hazzani. He was also supported by the descendants of Muhammad ibn Abd al-Wahhab and other significant tribal leaders who regarded Khalid bin Saud as the illegitimate ruler due to his alliance with the Egyptians. Abdullah ruled the emirate from Riyadh.  

In 1842 Bahraini royal Mohammed bin Khalifa asked help from Abdullah following his defeat at al Nasfah battle against the ruler of Bahrain, Abdullah bin Ahmad Al Khalifa. He was granted asylum, but not military assistance. In 1843 Faisal bin Turki bin Abdullah Al Saud, another third-cousin of Abdullah was released by the Egyptians in Cairo and managed to regain the rulership of the Emirate in May 1843.

Death and personal life
Abdullah did not endorse the leadership of Faisal and was imprisoned in Al Masmak fortress where he died of poisoning in July 1843. He was buried in Riyadh following the funeral prayers led by Imam Faisal bin Turki.

One of Abdullah's sons was born on the same day he died. Due to this, he was also named Abdullah. He was the father of Ahmed bin Abdullah Al Thunayan and paternal grandfather of Iffat bint Mohammad Al Thunayan.

References

External links

19th-century monarchs in the Middle East
19th-century murdered monarchs
1843 deaths
Abdullah
Assassinated Saudi Arabian politicians
Abdullah
Year of birth missing